Daniel Doron (1929-2022) was an Israeli political activist and translator. He was the founder and director of the Israel Center for Social and Economic Progress (ICSEP). In this capacity, he recommended economic changes to the Israeli government, some of which have successfully been implemented.  He wrote on the advantages of free market economics for The Wall Street Journal and The Jerusalem Post. He translated The Catcher in the Rye and A Portrait of the Artist as a Young Man into Hebrew.

Biography 
Daniel Doron was a third-generation sabra. His grandfather, Zerah Barnett, was one of the first Jewish pioneers in Palestine. Doron served Air Force Intelligence during the 1948 Arab-Israeli War in 1948, and studied sociology and economics at the Hebrew University of Jerusalem.  In the 1960s, Daniel Doron resumed his studies as a Fellow of the University of Chicago's Committee on Social Thought, and then with Lionel Trilling and Jacques Barzuz as a visiting scholar at Columbia University. His exposure to economist Milton Friedman, Friedrich Hayek and other free market intellectual forces at the University of Chicago greatly influenced him. Later, the philosophies Doron acquired in the United States would lead him to push for free market changes in Israel's anti-competitive, socialist society and economy.

Public service career 
He served under Teddy Kollek, then director-general of the Prime Minister's Office. In 1957, Doron was delegated by the Prime Minister's Office to serve as special consultant to the US Embassy in Tel Aviv.

He also served on an economic advisory group for Prime Minister Binyamin Netanyahu and on the Israel Government Council for National and Economic Planning, was a member of the board of the Entrepreneurial Center of Tel Aviv University, and is a member of the Mont-Pelerin Society. Doron was among the founders of The Herzliyah Conference, served on its steering committee and initiated its economic segment.

Political activism 
Since 1973, Doron has been involved in political and economic reform in Israel. He helped to found the Shinui political party which succeeded in gaining a foothold in the Israeli Knesset.

In 1983, Doron founded the Israel Center for Social and Economic Progress (ICSEP), a non-profit organization that seeks to increase the competitiveness of the Israeli economy. ICSEP conducts seminars for top Israeli university students to study free market economics,  and employs respected Israeli economic thinkers to examine Israeli markets in search of anti-competitive inefficiencies.

ICSEP recommended that Israeli banks be barred from the Israeli capital markets. The Israeli Knesset later passed the Bachar Reforms codifying Daniel Doron's recommendations.

Art career 
Doron was sole representative of the artist Shalom of Safed, arranging 15 museum exhibitions. Doron's film on Shalom won important awards and was represented in the US at international festivals.

References

External links
 About Doron at the Kivunim website

Living people
Hebrew University of Jerusalem Faculty of Social Sciences alumni
Israeli economists
Israeli political writers
Public relations people
1929 births